The Mk 20 Mod 0 was a 40mm automatic grenade launcher manufactured by NOS Louisville which was used by the US Navy during the Vietnam War. It used a blow-forward mechanism that was previously used on semi-automatic pistols such as the Steyr Mannlicher M1894 and Schwarzlose Model 1908. The Mk 20 was eventually replaced by the Mk 19 Mod 3.

See also
Comparison of automatic grenade launchers
Mk 18 Mod 0 grenade launcher

References
Mk20 Mod 0

Blow forward firearms
Automatic grenade launchers
40×46mm grenade launchers
Autocannon
Machine guns of the United States
40 mm artillery
Military equipment introduced in the 1960s